Ngandu, N’gandu or Ng'andu may refer to
Ngandu (name)
Ngandu, Kenya, a settlement
Bishop Gatimu Ngandu Girls High School in Kenya
Lake Ishiba Ng'andu in Zambia
Shiwa Ngandu, English-style country house and estate in Zambia